Mary R. Grizzle (née Pearson; August 19, 1921 – November 9, 2006), was a legislator and advocate of the Equal Rights Amendment, who served in both houses of the Florida state legislature. She was the first female Republican to serve in the Florida legislature.

In 1963, she was elected to the Florida House of Representatives. From 1974 to 1978 she served as House Republican Leader Pro-Tempore, making her the first woman in Florida elected to a leadership position. In 1978, she was elected to the Florida Senate.

She introduced and passed the Married Women Property Rights Act, which became law in 1970, giving married women in Florida, for the first time, the right to own property solely in their names and to transfer that property without their husbands' signatures. She also sponsored legislation admitting women to jury duty, providing equal pay for equal work, providing maternity leave for teachers, and requiring state licensing for child care centers. In 1972, she co-sponsored a bill that set strict standards on sewage dumped into Tampa Bay.

Legacy
In 1990, the Florida Senate passed a resolution naming her "Dean of the Legislature" because she had the longest continuous term of service there. She stayed in the Senate until 1992. In 2003, she was inducted into the Florida Women's Hall of Fame.

The Mary Grizzle Building, a business center, is located in Largo, Florida.

Early life
She grew up near Ironton, Ohio, where she was born. Grizzle went to business college in Portsmouth, Ohio. She worked for an insurance business. After World War II started, she moved to Washington, D.C. and worked for the War Production Board. She met Ben Grizzle and they got married. They moved to Florida in 1949. Grizzle was involved with the PTA and with the Republican Party. She served as town commissioner for Belleair, Florida.

References

External links

|-

|-

|-

1921 births
2006 deaths
People from Ironton, Ohio
People from Belleair, Florida
Women state legislators in Florida
Republican Party members of the Florida House of Representatives
Republican Party Florida state senators
20th-century American politicians
20th-century American women politicians
21st-century American women